Shir Hashirim is an album of vocal music by John Zorn, written in 2008, recorded in New York City in September 2010, and released on the Tzadik label in December 2013. The album features compositions inspired by the Song of Songs and cover art by Auguste Rodin.

Track listing
All compositions by John Zorn
 "Kiss Me" - 4:08  
 "Rose of Sharon" - 3:11  
 "At Night in My Bed" - 3:46  
 "How Beautiful You Are" - 3:07  
 "I Have Come Into My Garden" - 5:22  
 "Where Has Your Lover Gone" - 3:45  
 "Dance Again" - 3:36  
 "O, If You Were Only My Brother" - 4:07

Personnel
The Sapphites:
Abigail Fischer, Kathryn Mulvehill, Kirsten Sollek, Lisa Bielawa, Martha Cluver - voice

Production
Marc Urselli - engineer, audio mixer
Scott Hull - mastering
John Zorn and Kazunori Sugiyama – producers

References
 

2013 albums
John Zorn albums
Albums produced by John Zorn
Tzadik Records albums